Orchard is a surname. Notable people with the surname include:

Anthony Orchard (1946–), Australian botanist
Danielle Orchard (1985–), American artist
Dave Orchard (1948–), South African cricket umpire
David Orchard (1950–), Canadian politician
Donald Orchard (1946–), Canadian politician
Henry John Orchard (1922–2004), American scientist
John Orchard (1928–1995), American actor
Julian Orchard (1930–1979), British actor
Len Orchard (1912–),  Welsh rugby league footballer who played in the 1930s
Phil Orchard (1948–2018), New Zealand rugby league footballer
Robert Orchard, British journalist
Robert Orchard (rugby league), New Zealand rugby league player
Tony Orchard (1941–2005), British inorganic chemist
Wallace Orchard (1890–1917), Canadian ice hockey player
William Edwin Orchard (1877–1955) British author, minister and Catholic convert